This is a list of American films released in 2020.

Due to the COVID-19 pandemic, numerous notable films that were originally scheduled for release from mid-March to December were postponed to release in mid through late 2020, in 2021 and in 2022, or were released on video on demand or on streaming services throughout 2020.

Box office 
The highest-grossing American films released in 2020, by domestic box office gross revenue, are as follows:

January–March

April–June

July–September

October–December

See also 
 List of 2020 box office number-one films in the United States
 2020 in the United States
 Impact of the COVID-19 pandemic on cinema
 List of films impacted by the COVID-19 pandemic

References

External links 

 

Films
Lists of 2020 films by country or language
2020